Niambézaaria (also spelled Niambézaria) is a town in southern Ivory Coast. It is a sub-prefecture of Lakota Department in Lôh-Djiboua Region, Gôh-Djiboua District.

Niambézaaria was a commune until March 2012, when it became one of 1126 communes nationwide that were abolished.

In 2014, the population of the sub-prefecture of Niambézaria was 61,253.

Villages
The xx villages of the sub-prefecture of Niambézaria and their population in 2014 are:

References

Sub-prefectures of Lôh-Djiboua
Former communes of Ivory Coast